Brockway station is a historic railway station located at Brockway, Jefferson County, Pennsylvania. It was built in 1913 by the Buffalo, Rochester and Pittsburgh Railroad, and is a one-story, rectangular brick building with Colonial Revival-style details.  It sits on a poured cement foundation and has a hipped roof covered in red ceramic tile.  

The Baltimore and Ohio Railroad operated both daytime and nighttime trains through the station on the BR&P route between Lackawanna Terminal in Buffalo and Baltimore and Ohio Station in Pittsburgh. Additionally, the company operated a local Buffalo to DuBois, Pennsylvania train, making stops at the station. B&O passenger service to Brockway continued up to 1955, the final year of service on the BR&P line.  It is the only surviving passenger station in Jefferson County.

It was added to the National Register of Historic Places in 2003 as the Brockwayville Passenger Depot, Buffalo, Rochester and Pittsburgh Railroad.

References

Railway stations on the National Register of Historic Places in Pennsylvania
Colonial Revival architecture in Pennsylvania
Railway stations in the United States opened in 1913
Transportation buildings and structures in Jefferson County, Pennsylvania
Former Baltimore and Ohio Railroad stations
1913 establishments in Pennsylvania
National Register of Historic Places in Jefferson County, Pennsylvania